Peregrine Andrew Morny Cavendish, 12th Duke of Devonshire,  (also known as "Stoker"; born 27 April 1944) is an English peer. He is the only surviving son of Andrew Cavendish, 11th Duke of Devonshire and his wife, the former Deborah Mitford. He succeeded to the dukedom following the death of his father on 3 May 2004. Before his succession, he was styled Earl of Burlington from birth until 1950 and Marquess of Hartington between 1950 and 2004. His immediate family are owner-occupiers of Chatsworth House and are worth an estimated £900 million. Estates landscaped before 1900 by the family (who maintain a luxury hotels business) are parts of Derbyshire and North Yorkshire. Other capital managed by the Duke includes fine and contemporary art, forestry and farming.

Education
He was educated at Eton College, Exeter College, Oxford, where he read History, and at the Royal Agricultural College (now the Royal Agricultural University), Cirencester.

Horse racing
The Duke is well known in the world of horse racing and served as Her Majesty's Representative at Ascot and chairman of Ascot Racecourse Ltd. In 1980 he was elected to the Jockey Club and in 1989 he was appointed its Senior Steward (that is, Chairman). During his five-year term of office, he oversaw a number of changes within the racing industry, in particular the creation of the British Horseracing Board which is now the governing authority for British racing. He was appointed first chairman of the board in June 1993 and retired at the end of his term in 1996. He was appointed Commander of the Order of the British Empire (CBE) for services to racing in 1997 and Knight Commander of the Royal Victorian Order (KCVO) in the 2009 New Year Honours for his services as Her Majesty's Representative at Ascot.

Other interests
He was appointed a Trustee of the Wallace Collection in 2007. He is a trustee of Sheffield Galleries and Museums Trust. 

He is Chairman of the Devonshire Arms Hotel Group, a chain of countryside hotels in North Yorkshire and Derbyshire, and Deputy Chairman of Sotheby's. He collects modern British and contemporary painting and sculpture, as well as works in other areas, many of which are on display at his family seat Chatsworth House. The Duke and Duchess and the house and estate grounds were featured in the BBC documentary series Chatsworth. 

In December 2012, he sold Auxiliary cartoon for the Head of a Young Apostle by Raphael for £29.7m at a Sotheby's auction. 

As of 2016, he is the owner of Heywood Hill, a notable bookstore in London where his aunt Nancy Mitford used to work.

He took up the position as the third Chancellor of the University of Derby at a ceremony on 28 October 2008 in Buxton.

The Duke is a current patron of St Wilfrid's Hospice in Eastbourne.

The range of Cavendish Pianos was named after the family name of the Duke to recognise his support, which was critical to the establishment of the new firm.

He was the third Chancellor of the University of Derby from 2008 to March 2018. He stepped down from the role in 2018 and his son and heir, William Cavendish, Earl of Burlington was nominated and installed as the fourth and current Chancellor of the University in March 2018.

The Duke has provided a Swaledale Ram as mascot to the Mercian Regiment since the regiment's inception. In 2017, he presented Private Derby to the Regiment.

Marriage and children
The Duke married Amanda Carmen Heywood-Lonsdale, daughter of Commander Edward Gavin Heywood-Lonsdale, on 28 June 1967.  They have three children:

 William Cavendish, Earl of Burlington (born 6 June 1969), heir apparent to the dukedom.
 Lady Celina Imogen Cavendish (born 4 October 1971)
 Lady Jasmine Nancy Cavendish (born 4 May 1973), married to Nicholas Dunne, son of Sir Thomas Dunne KG KCVO

Chatsworth House
One of the homes of the Duke and Duchess is Chatsworth House in Derbyshire. They are involved in the operation of the house as a tourist attraction. In 2019, the Duke and Duchess visited Sotheby's to view "Treasures From Chatsworth", including art and artifacts from Chatsworth House, that would be displayed in New York.

Titles, honours and arms

Titles 
He succeeded as the 12th Duke of Devonshire, 12th Marquess of Hartington, the 7th Earl of Burlington, the 15th Earl of Devonshire, the 15th Baron Cavendish of Hardwick, and the 7th Baron Cavendish of Keighley on 3 May 2004.

In February 2010, the Duke announced his intention to give up his title if hereditary peers were removed from the House of Lords, on the basis that "the aristocracy is dead" and "because then it would be clear-cut what the people wanted, and it would be confusing to maintain hereditary titles".

Honours
Knight Commander of the Royal Victorian Order (2008)
Commander of the Order of the British Empire (1997)
Chancellor of the University of Derby (October 2008 – March 2018)

References

 

1944 births
Living people
People educated at Eton College
Alumni of Exeter College, Oxford
Commanders of the Order of the British Empire
Knights Commander of the Royal Victorian Order
Deputy Lieutenants of Derbyshire
112
07
Peregrine Cavendish, 12th Duke of Devonshire
People associated with the University of Derby
People from Derbyshire Dales (district)
20th-century British landowners
21st-century British landowners
Horse racing administrators
Mitford family